"Stay with Me" is a song by British synthpop duo Erasure, released in September 1995 as the lead single from their self-titled, seventh studio album, Erasure (1995). Written by Vince Clarke and Andy Bell, it is a slow love ballad. Starting with simple synth chords from Clarke and subdued vocal from Bell, the song builds to a mid-tempo gospel-influenced conclusion, complete with vocal contributions from the London Community Gospel Choir. Like the other two singles from this album, it was edited for its release. It was not as successful as prior Erasure singles, reaching number fifteen on the UK Singles Chart, and it did not chart in the United States or Germany. In Denmark, it peaked at number 10 while it reached number 13 in Sweden. In an interview with John Marshall from Lincs FM in 2009, Bell stated that "Stay With Me" was one of his favourite Erasure songs.

The single's B-side, "True Love Wars", is an extension of the Erasure album opener "Intro: Guess I'm Into Feeling". Both tracks use the same instrumental track and share several vocal elements, although they are different songs.

Critical reception
Ned Raggett from AllMusic described the song as "quietly intoxicating". Larry Flick from Billboard felt it stands among the duo's "most enchanting and hitworthy recordings to date." He noted that the music "blends delicate music-box-like keyboards with Andy Bell's gorgeous, theatrical vocal performance", and added further that "this ballad soars to a beautiful conclusion, as Bell is surrounded by a gospel choir that adds spiritual depth to the song's sweet, romantic lyrics." Ross Jones from The Guardian named it "one of their best; a salty slowie more beautiful than this world deserves." Chris Gerard from Metro Weekly commented, "If anybody ever doubts that Andy Bell is a first-rate vocalist, play them "Stay with Me" immediately. The layers of sound that he develops, along with Clarke's simple keyboard line, are simply magical." 

Pan-European magazine Music & Media said, "The question is which version are you going to air? ACE is best advised to take the Guitar Mix of the sad love song, EHR won't have problems with the electronic Flow Mix, while "dance" can do the rest." Music Week gave it three out of five, declaring it as "a delicate but powerful electronic ballad, produced by the Orb's Thomas Fehlmann." They added that the "slow-burning" song "is heard best in context, where Clarke's churchy keyboard patterns are played against a classic, impassioned performance by Bell." A reviewer from People Magazine wrote, "Thanks to an emphasis on gorgeous torch tunes like "Rock Me Gently" and "Stay with Me", lead singer Andy Bell's always operatic vocals take on a newfound luster". Darren Lee from The Quietus felt that it "remain [a] serviceable enough" ballad, "but lack the pizzazz and charm of earlier releases."

Music video
A music video was made to accompany the song. It was later published on YouTube in September 2014, and had generated more than 310 000 views as of November 2020.

Track listings

 Cassette single (CMUTE174)
 "Stay With Me" (Single Edit)
 "True Love Wars"

 12" single (12MUTE174)
 "Stay With Me" (NY Mix)
 "Stay With Me" (Flow Mix)
 "True Love Wars" (Omni Mix)
 "Stay With Me" (Guitar Mix)

 CD single #1 (CDMUTE174)
 "Stay With Me"
 "True Love Wars"
 "Stay With Me" (Basic Mix)
 "True Love Wars" (Omni Mix)

 CD single #2 (LCDMUTE174)
 "Stay With Me" (Flow Mix)
 "Stay With Me" (NY Mix)
 "Stay With Me" (Guitar Mix)
 "Stay With Me" (Castaway Dub)

 US maxi-single (66084-2)
 "Stay With Me" (Commercial Mix)
 "Stay With Me" (Basic Mix)
 "Stay With Me" (Flow Mix)
 "Stay With Me" (Guitar Mix)
 "Stay With Me" (NY Mix)
 "True Love Wars"

Charts

References 

1995 singles
Erasure songs
Songs written by Vince Clarke
Songs written by Andy Bell (singer)
Song recordings produced by Gareth Jones
Mute Records singles
Elektra Records singles